Cayratia acris is a species of plant native to Australia and Papua New Guinea.

References

 

acris
Flora of Queensland
Bushfood
Taxa named by Ferdinand von Mueller